Grisebach is a German surname. Notable people with this surname include:

 August Grisebach, a German botanist and phytogeographer
 Hans Grisebach, a German architect
 Ludolf Grisebach, a German film editor.
 Valeska Grisebach, a German film director

German-language surnames